Heliopsis lanceolata is a rare South American species of flowering plant in the family Asteraceae. It has been found only in Colombia. It, H. canescens, and H. decumbens are the only three known species of their genus endemic to South America. All the other species are indigenous to North America, with one (H. buphthalmoides) found on both continents.

References

lanceolata
Endemic flora of Colombia
Plants described in 1940